ZEN.com is an international fintech company with offices in Vilnius, Rzeszow, Krakow and Gdansk. The financial institution received a license from the Central Bank of Lithuania. Amidst Russian invasion of Ukraine in 2022, Zen started collecting money on a special account to help Ukraine and provided a  shelter for mothers and children who had fled from Ukraine. It also made its services free for Ukrainians.

Overview 
ZEN was founded in 2018 by Dawid Rożek in Poland, who previously founded G2A gaming platform.

The company was authorized on May 24, 2018, in Lithuania by the Central Bank of Lithuania. The license was approved by regulators in 31 countries and the European Banking Authority.

In November 2020, Zen.com was launched.  In the same month, the company started cooperation with Mastercard.

The company also cooperates with VISA, American Express, and Union Pay.

In April 2021, ZEN.com provided the Polish IBAN number in cooperation with BNP Paribas. The same month, fintech added a new feature for money transfers – ZEN Buddies.

In 2021, ZEN.com began cooperation with PayPal and multinational online payments company Paysafe.

In 2022, as a response to unprovoked Russian invasion of Ukraine Zen decided to help Ukrainian refuges, having devoted 5500 m2 facilities for moms with kids, and it also started fundraising money through its financial platform to help and support Ukraine and its refuges.

References 

Companies established in 2018
Financial technology companies